Andres Tarand's cabinet was in office in Estonia from 8 November 1994 to 17 April 1995, when it was succeeded by Tiit Vähi's second cabinet.

Members

This cabinet's members were the following:
 Andres Tarand – Prime Minister
 Kaido Kama – Minister of Interior Affairs
 Jüri Luik – Minister of Foreign Affairs
 Jüri Adams – Minister of Justice
 Toivo Jürgenson – Minister of Economic Affairs

References

Cabinets of Estonia